Fatty acid binding protein 9, testis is a protein that in humans is encoded by the FABP9 gene.

References

Further reading 

 
 
 
 

Genes
Human proteins